Hotagterklip is a small hamlet on the South African coast, close to the village of Struisbaai in the Western Cape.

‘Hotagterklip’ is the Afrikaans for 'left rear stone'. The unusual name of this little place comes from the days of the first ox wagon trek, when a stone outcrop imposed a sharp detour on travelers.

The fishermen's cottages in Hotagterklip have been declared provincial heritage sites. They are featured in the paintings of a number of South African artists. Many of the old cottages fell into ruin, until original cottages were restored in the 1990s.

External links
 Hotagterklip and Kassiesbaai - Conservation and community challenges of two fishing villages in the Overberg - Ashley Lillie, 1995

Populated places in the Cape Agulhas Local Municipality